Promotion may refer to:

Marketing
 Promotion (marketing), one of the four marketing mix elements, comprising any type of marketing communication used to inform or persuade target audiences of the relative merits of a product, service, brand or issue
 Advertising campaign, a promotional campaign
 Film promotion
 Promotional recording
 Radio promotion

Status or progress
 Promotion (chess), when a pawn reaches the eighth rank
 Promotion (Germany), the German term for the doctoral degree
 Promotion (rank),  the advancement of an employee's rank or position in an organizational hierarchy system
 Promotion and relegation, in sports leagues, is a process where some teams are transferred between multiple divisions based on their performance for the completed season

Arts, entertainment, and media
 Promotion (film), a 2013 Bengali film directed by Snehasish Chakraborty
 "The Promotion" (The Office episode)
 The Promotion, a 2008 film

Other uses
 ProMotion, a display feature on iPad “Pro” models starting with iPad Pro (10.5-inch) and (12.9-inch, 2nd generation), iPhone “Pro” models starting with iPhone 13 Pro and MacBook “Pro” models starting with MacBook Pro M1 (14 and 16-inch, 2021)
 Professional wrestling promotion (also federation or fed), a company or business that regularly performs shows involving professional wrestling, or a role which entails management, advertising, and logistics of running a wrestling event (see promoter)
 Promotion or trump promotion; see Glossary of contract bridge terms

See also
 Demotion
 Promoter (entertainment)